Teatralna Square (translit.: Teatral`na ploscha; literally: Theatre Square) is a city square in Voroshilovskyi District of Donetsk, Ukraine. It's located at the junction of Avenue Theatre and Artema Street, the main street in Donetsk. The square is named after the theatre situated there — Donetsk State Academic Opera and Ballet Theatre Solovyanenko.

The square is served by numerous marshrutkas, buses and trolley-buses.

Attractions 
 Donetsk State Academic Opera and Ballet Theatre Solovyanenko
 Cinema Shevchenko
 Monument Gurov
 Monument Grinkevich
 Monument Solovyanenko
 Scythian track
 Dwelling houses designed by architect Blahodatnyi

External links 
 

Squares in Donetsk
Tourist attractions in Donetsk Oblast